

214001–214100 

|-id=081
| 214081 Balavoine ||  || Daniel Balavoine (1952–1986), French singer and songwriter. || 
|}

214101–214200 

|-id=136
| 214136 Alinghi ||  || Alinghi, the name of several Swiss yachts, operated by the Société Nautique de Genève. The crew won several races including the America's Cup in 2003. || 
|-id=180
| 214180 Mabaglioni ||  || Maurizio Baglioni (born 1947) graduated in electrical engineering from the University of Rome "La Sapienza". He works in engineering and management. His main interests are in celestial mechanics and archeoastronomy, where he focused on astronomical studies of the ancient Assyrians, Babylonians and Mayans. || 
|}

214201–214300 

|-bgcolor=#f2f2f2
| colspan=4 align=center | 
|}

214301–214400 

|-id=378
| 214378 Kleinmann ||  || Georges Kleinmann (born 1930), retired journalist and producer for Swiss public television who covered the Apollo space missions. || 
|}

214401–214500 

|-id=432
| 214432 Belprahon ||  || Belprahon, a Swiss village located in the Bernese Jura, the French-speaking part of the canton of Bern. || 
|-id=474
| 214474 Long Island ||  || Long Island, the 190-km-long, fish-shaped island that extends east from New York City. The island is composed of multiple terminal moraines deposited during the most recent glacial period. || 
|-id=475
| 214475 Chrisbayus ||  || Chris Bayus (born 1957), American amateur astronomer and an accomplished astrophotographer. || 
|-id=476
| 214476 Stephencolbert ||  || Stephen Colbert (born 1964), American political satirist, writer, comedian, actor and television host. || 
|-id=485
| 214485 Dupouy ||  || Philippe Dupouy (born 1952), founder of the Observatoire de Dax in 1978. || 
|-id=487
| 214487 Baranivka ||  || The Ukrainian town of Baranivka, known for one of the oldest plants for the production of porcelain || 
|}

214501–214600 

|-bgcolor=#f2f2f2
| colspan=4 align=center | 
|}

214601–214700 

|-bgcolor=#f2f2f2
| colspan=4 align=center | 
|}

214701–214800 

|-id=715
| 214715 Silvanofuso ||  || Silvano Fuso (born 1959), Italian teacher and a science writer, who worked in the field of molecular spectroscopy || 
|-id=772
| 214772 UNICEF ||  || The United Nations Children's Fund (UNICEF) is a United Nations' program headquartered in New York City that provides humanitarian and developmental assistance to children and mothers in developing countries. || 
|}

214801–214900 

|-id=819
| 214819 Gianotti ||  || Fabiola Gianotti (born 1960), the coordinator of the ATLAS experiment at the CERN's Large Hadron Collider. || 
|-id=820
| 214820 Faustocoppi ||  || Fausto Coppi (1919–1960), an Italian cyclist and the dominant international cyclist of the years before and after the Second World War. || 
|-id=863
| 214863 Seiradakis ||  || John H. Seiradakis (born 1948) is a Greek radio astronomer, emeritus professor at Aristotle University of Thessaloniki, and former Director of the Observatory of Thessaloniki. He has contributed significantly to our knowledge of pulsars, archaeoastronomy, and of the Antikythera Mechanism, the earliest known astronomical computer. || 
|-id=883
| 214883 Yuanxikun ||  || Yuan Xikun (born 1944), a Chinese sculptor and painter. || 
|}

214901–215000 

|-id=911
| 214911 Viehboeck ||  || Franz Viehböck (born 1960),  electrical engineer and first Austrian astronaut || 
|-id=928
| 214928 Carrara ||  || Carrara is a town and municipality in the province of Massa-Carrara, Tuscany. It is the world's most important center for the extraction and processing of Carrara marble, a very precious white marble that is extracted from the nearby Apuane Alps. || 
|-id=953
| 214953 Giugavazzi ||  || Giuseppe Gavazzi (born 1936), an Italian painter and sculptor || 
|}

References 

214001-215000